
Gmina Skulsk is a rural gmina (administrative district) in Konin County, Greater Poland Voivodeship, in west-central Poland.

Villages
Gmina Skulsk contains the villages and settlements of Buszkowo, Buszkowo-Parcele, Celinowo, Czartówek, Czartowo, Dąb, Dzierżysław, Galiszewo, Gawrony, Goplana, Kobylanki, Kolonia Warzymowska, Koszewo, Lisewo, Lisewo-Parcele, Łuszczewo, Mielnica Duża, Mielnica Mała, Mniszki B, Nowa Wieś, Paniewo, Piastowo, Pilich, Popielewo, Przyłubie, Radwańczewo, Rakowo, Skulsk, Skulska Wieś, Starostwo, Wandowo, Warzymowo, Włodzimiera, Zalesie and Zygmuntowo.

Neighbouring gminas
Gmina Skulsk is bordered by the gminas of Jeziora Wielkie, Kruszwica, Piotrków Kujawski, Ślesin, Wierzbinek and Wilczyn.

References
Polish official population figures 2006

Skulsk
Konin County